Mark Wills is the debut studio album by the American country music singer of the same name. Released in 1996 on Mercury Nashville Records, the album produced three hit singles on the Billboard Hot Country Singles & Tracks (now Hot Country Songs) charts: "Jacob's Ladder", "High Low and In Between", and "Places I've Never Been", which peaked at #6, #33, and #5, respectively. The album itself reached a peak of #38 on the Billboard Top Country Albums charts. "Look Where She Is Today" was previously cut by Doug Stone on his 1995 album Faith in Me, Faith in You. And "Ace of Hearts" was previously cut by Alan Jackson on his 1990 debut album Here in the Real World.

Critical reception

Alanna Nash of Entertainment Weekly rated the album "B+", stating in her review that the album "is full of rambunctious good-time songs teeming with sly wit and bittersweet ballads — all in a baritone that throbs with emotion." Jeffrey B. Remz of Country Standard Time'' was largely unfavorable, praising "High Low and In Between" but otherwise saying that Wills "recalls David Lee Murphy vocally, but sings a bit too effortlessly throughout, never sounding all that convincing as if he's lived the songs". He also described the album as "competent, but never rising above".

Track listing

Personnel
Paul Franklin – steel guitar
Aubrey Haynie – fiddle
Dirk Johnson – piano
Mike Johnson – steel guitar
Brent Mason – electric guitar
Gary Prim – piano, clavinet 
Matt Rollings – piano
Brent Rowan – electric guitar
John Wesley Ryles – background vocals
Wayne Toups – accordion
Mark Wills – lead vocals
John Willis – acoustic guitar, mandolin
Lonnie Wilson – drums
Glenn Worf – bass guitar

Production
Produced By Carson Chamberlain & Keith Stegall
Engineers: John Kelton, Steve Lowery
Assistant Engineers: Steve Lowery, Paula Montondo
Mixing: John Kelton
Mastering: Hank Williams

Chart performance

References

1996 debut albums
Albums produced by Carson Chamberlain
Albums produced by Keith Stegall
Mercury Nashville albums
Mark Wills albums